Vanessa Davis is an Australian actress best known for her roles in the Housos television series and movies. She studied a degree in musical theatre at the Australian Institute of Music.

Filmography

Film
 Hatfield and McCoy (2012)
 Housos vs. Authority (2012)
 Fat Pizza vs. Housos (2014)
  Dumb Criminals: The Movie (2015)
 Tough & Cookie (short) (2015)
 Fat Pizza vs. Housos Live (2016)

Television
 Housos (2011 - 2013)
 Fat Pizza: Back In Business
 Housos vs Virus (2020)

Stage
 Housos Live on Stage (2014)

References

21st-century Australian actresses
Living people
Year of birth missing (living people)